"Birthday" is a song by English singer Anne-Marie. She co-wrote the song with Delacey, Keith Sorrells and Warren Felder. It was released as a single on 9 February 2020.

Background
In an interview when she was on Sunday Brunch, she said the song reflects the happiness she is feeling at the moment, "Do you know what, I've written a lot of songs about being angry at my exes, which I think I'm quite known for so when I went into this new album I was like 'Do you know what, I'm happy at the moment, this song kind of shows that I think".

She also explained, that around October 2019, she heard many Christmas songs and noticed, that there are only a few versions of Birthday songs, so she decided to make her own.

Music video
The official music video was filmed in Los Angeles and uploaded to YouTube on 7 February 2020. The video was directed by Hannah Lux Davis with creative direction from Kate Moross. The video shows Anne-Marie celebrating her birthday like a princess, complete with a ball gown and dancing in an opulent room. At  midnight she's back home and hanging out with her friends.

Live performances
Anne-Marie performed the song for the first time on The Greatest Dancer on 8 February 2020. Other major performances include her performance on Sunday Brunch, Saturday Night Takeaway and Celebrity Juice.

Track listing

Charts

Certifications

Release history

References

2020 singles
2020 songs
Anne-Marie (singer) songs
Music videos directed by Hannah Lux Davis
Song recordings produced by Oak Felder
Songs about birthdays
Songs written by Anne-Marie (singer)
Songs written by Oak Felder
Songs written by Keith Sorrells